Idana is a genus of flies in the family Ulidiidae. There is at least one described species in Idana, I. marginata.

References

Tephritoidea genera
Articles created by Qbugbot